Poltergeist is a 1982 American supernatural horror film directed by Tobe Hooper and written by Steven Spielberg, Michael Grais and Mark Victor from a story by Spielberg. It stars JoBeth Williams, Craig T. Nelson and Beatrice Straight, and was produced by Spielberg and Frank Marshall. The film focuses on a suburban family whose home is invaded by malevolent ghosts that abduct their youngest daughter.

As Spielberg was contractually unable to direct another film while he made E.T. the Extra-Terrestrial, Hooper was selected based on his work on The Texas Chain Saw Massacre and The Funhouse. Spielberg conceived Poltergeist as a horror sequel to his 1977 film Close Encounters of the Third Kind titled Night Skies; however, Hooper was less interested in the sci-fi elements and suggested they collaborate on a ghost story. Accounts differ as to the level of Spielberg's involvement, but it is clear that he was frequently on set during filming and exerted significant creative control. For that reason, some have expressed the view that Spielberg should be considered the film's co-director or even main director, though both Spielberg and Hooper have disputed this.

Released by Metro-Goldwyn-Mayer on June 4, 1982, Poltergeist was a major critical and commercial success, becoming the eighth-highest-grossing film of 1982. In the years since its release, the film has been recognized as a horror classic. It was nominated for three Academy Awards, named by the Chicago Film Critics Association as the 20th-scariest film ever made, and the scene of the clown doll attack was ranked as No. 80 on Bravo's 100 Scariest Movie Moments. Poltergeist also appeared at No. 84 on American Film Institute's 100 Years...100 Thrills, a list of America's most heart-pounding movies. The film was followed by Poltergeist II: The Other Side (1986), Poltergeist III (1988), and a 2015 remake.

Plot 
Steven and Diane Freeling live in the planned community of Cuesta Verde, California. Steven is a successful real estate agent, and Diane looks after their three children: 16-year-old Dana, eight-year-old Robbie, and five-year-old Carol Anne. Late one night, Carol Anne inexplicably converses with the family's television set while it displays post-broadcast static. The next night, she again fixates on the television, and a ghostly white hand emerges from the screen, followed by a violent earthquake. As the family is shaken awake by the quake, Carol Anne eerily declares, "They're here."

The following day is filled with bizarre events: a glass of milk spontaneously breaks, silverware bends, and furniture moves on its own. These phenomena initially seem benign, but soon grow more sinister. During a severe thunderstorm, the gnarled backyard tree seemingly comes alive. A large limb crashes through the children's bedroom window, grabs Robbie, pulls him outside into the pouring rain and attempts to devour him. While the family rushes outside to rescue Robbie, Carol Anne is drawn into a portal inside the closet. After saving Robbie from the tree, which got sucked into a tornado, the family frantically search for Carol Anne, only for her voice to call out from the television.

Parapsychologist Martha Lesh arrives with team members Ryan and Marty to investigate. They determine there is a poltergeist intrusion involving multiple ghosts. Meanwhile, Steven learns from his boss that the Cuesta Verde development was built on a former cemetery and the graves were moved to a nearby location.

Dana and Robbie are sent away for safety, while Dr. Lesh calls in Tangina Barrons, a spiritual medium. Tangina determines the spirits are lingering in a different "sphere of consciousness" and are not at rest. They are attracted to Carol Anne's life force. Tangina also detects a dark presence she calls the "Beast," who is restraining Carol Anne and manipulating her life force in order to prevent the other spirits from crossing over.

The entrance to the other dimension is in the children's bedroom closet and exits through the living room ceiling. Diane, secured by a rope, passes through the portal, guided by another rope previously threaded through both portals. Diane retrieves Carol Anne, and they drop through the ceiling to the living room floor, covered in ectoplasm. As they recover from the ordeal, Tangina proclaims the house is "clean."

Shortly after, the Freeling family have nearly finished packing to move out of the house. Before the family is to leave, Steven goes to his office while Dana is on a date, leaving Diane at home with Robbie and Carol Anne. The "Beast" ambushes Diane and the children, aiming for a second kidnapping attempt. The unseen force drives Diane to the backyard in the pouring rain, where she stumbles into the flooded swimming pool excavation. Skeletal corpses and coffins float up around her in the muddy hole. Diane crawls out and rushes back into the house. She rescues the children, and they escape to the outside as more coffins and bodies erupt from the ground.

Steven, accompanied by Teague, his boss, arrives home to the mayhem and realizes that only the gravestones were relocated; the development was built over the abandoned bodies. The Freelings jump into their car and collect Dana just as she returns home. They flee Cuesta Verde as the house implodes into the portal while Teague and stunned neighbors look on. The family checks into their room at a motel, where Steven promptly rips out the TV and shoves it outside.

Cast

Production 
Michael Grais and Mark Victor had written an unproduced comedy called Turn Left And Die and the action film Death Hunt when Steven Spielberg decided to invite them to possibly work with him. After screening A Guy Named Joe for them and saying he wanted to remake that film—which he would in 1989's Always—Spielberg also mentioned a ghost story idea he intended to turn into a script. Grais called Spielberg the next day saying he and Victor only had interest in the ghost story, and after plans with another writer fell through, Spielberg brought the two to the job.

Principal photography rolled mostly on Roxbury Street in Simi Valley, California. Following completion of principal photography in the first week of August 1981, Hooper went on to spend ten weeks in the editing room compiling the first cut of the film. During much of this time, Spielberg was at Industrial Light & Magic (ILM) supervising the VFX photography.

Creative credit 
A clause in the Universal Studios contract prevented Steven Spielberg from directing another film while preparing E.T. the Extra-Terrestrial. According to Tobe Hooper, the very core concept of the film was an idea he pitched to Spielberg after turning down the offer to direct Night Skies. Writer Michael Grais stated that "we weren't really working with Spielberg because he was on E.T.", and that Spielberg only had sporadic meetings with the writers in MGM's commisary. E.T. and Poltergeist were released a week apart in June, 1982; Time and Newsweek referred to it as "The Spielberg Summer". There were suggestions that Spielberg, in addition to being Poltergeist'''s co-producer and co-writer, had also served as its de facto co-director. This view was bolstered by various statements Spielberg made about his involvement, including a Los Angeles Times quote on May 24, 1982: "Tobe isn't ... a take-charge sort of guy. If a question was asked and an answer wasn't immediately forthcoming, I'd jump in and say what we could do. Tobe would nod agreement, and that became the process of collaboration."

That same article noted that the Directors Guild of America had "opened an investigation into the question of whether or not Hooper's official credit was being denigrated by statements Spielberg has made, apparently claiming authorship." The investigation ended in an arbitrator's ruling that "MGM/UA Entertainment Co. must pay $15,000 to director Tobe Hooper because the studio gave producer Steven Spielberg a bigger credit than Hooper got in its trailers," although also noting that "broader issues of dispute exist between producer-writer (Spielberg) and the director" (damages of $200,000 were originally sought by the DGA). Co-producer Frank Marshall told the LA Times that "the creative force of the movie was Steven. Tobe was the director and was on the set every day. But Steven did the design for every storyboard and he was on the set every day except for three days when he was in Hawaii with Lucas." However, Hooper stated that he "did fully half of the storyboards."

The week of the film's release, The Hollywood Reporter printed an open letter to Hooper from Spielberg.

Regrettably, some of the press has misunderstood the rather unique, creative relationship which you and I shared throughout the making of Poltergeist.
I enjoyed your openness in allowing me, as a writer and a producer, a wide berth for creative involvement, just as I know you were happy with the freedom you had to direct Poltergeist so wonderfully.
Through the screenplay you accepted a vision of this very intense movie from the start, and as the director, you delivered the goods. You performed responsibly and professionally throughout, and I wish you great success on your next project.

In a 2007 Ain't It Cool News interview, Zelda Rubinstein discussed her recollections of the shooting process. She said "Steven directed all six days" she was on set: "Tobe set up the shots and Steven made the adjustments." She also alleged that Hooper "allowed some unacceptable chemical agents into his work," and that during her audition, "Tobe was only partially there." Comments from actor James Karen, concerning a 25th-anniversary Q&A event which both attended, categorized Rubinstein's remarks as unfair to Hooper. "She laid into Tobe and I don't know why ... Tobe was kind to her."

In a 2012 Rue Morgue article commemorating Poltergeist's 30th anniversary, interviews were conducted with several cast and crew members. In response to the magazine's query about the authorship issue, cast members unanimously sided with Hooper. James Karen said, "Tobe had a hard time on that film. It's tough when a producer is on set every day and there's always been a lot of talk about that. I considered Tobe my director. That's my stand on all those rumours." Martin Casella stated: "So much of Poltergeist looks and feels like a Spielberg movie but my recollection is that Tobe was mostly directing." Oliver Robins: "The guy who sets up the shots, blocks the actors and works with the crew to create a vision is the director. In those terms, Tobe was the director. He's the one who directed me, anyway." Make-up and effects artist Craig Reardon said Spielberg often had the final say. The original version of the cancerous steak, for instance, was created by Reardon per Hooper's specifications—but vetoed by Spielberg: "Although the first steak did not represent a killing amount of work, it had consumed enough time and effort—none of which I could afford to waste—that I determined in the future to make certain whatever I prepped would be approved in advance by Spielberg as well as Hooper."

Hooper was asked about the controversy in a 2015 interview with online journal Film Talk and said the rumors originated from a Los Angeles Times article which reported on Spielberg shooting footage of "little race cars" in front of the house while Hooper was busy elsewhere shooting another scene. "From there it became its own legend. That is how I remember it; I was making the movie and later on, I heard this stuff after it was finished. I really can’t set the record much straighter than that."

According to the Blumhouse Productions website, first assistant cameraman John R. Leonetti reported that Spielberg directed the film more so than Hooper, stating, "Hooper was so nice and just happy to be there. He creatively had input. Steven developed the movie, and it was his to direct, except there was anticipation of a director's strike, so he was 'the producer' but really he directed it in case there was going to be a strike and Tobe was cool with that. It wasn't anything against Tobe. Every once in a while, he would actually leave the set and let Tobe do a few things just because. But really, Steven directed it."

Following Hooper's passing on August 27, 2017, director Mick Garris, a publicist on the film who made several on-set visits, came to Hooper's defense on the Post Mortem podcast:

Tobe was always calling action and cut. Tobe had been deeply involved in all of the pre-production and everything. But Steven is a guy who will come in and call the shots. And so, you're on your first studio film, hired by Steven Spielberg, who is enthusiastically involved in this movie. Are you gonna say, 'Stop that... let me do this'? Which [Tobe] did.

[...] Tobe was a terrific filmmaker. I don't think it's that Steven was controlling. I think it was Steven was enthusiastic. And nobody was there to protect Tobe. But all of the pre-production was done by Tobe. Tobe was there throughout. Tobe's vision is very much realized there. And Tobe got credit because he deserved credit. Including... Steven Spielberg said that.

[...] Yes, Steven Spielberg was very much involved. It's a Tobe Hooper film.

 Special effects 
The special effects for Poltergeist were produced by Industrial Light and Magic and overseen by Richard Edlund. The film won the BAFTA Award for Best Special Visual Effects and earned a nomination for the Academy Award for Best Visual Effects, which it lost to Spielberg's other summer hit, E.T. the Extra-Terrestrial.

 Music 
The music for Poltergeist was written by veteran composer Jerry Goldsmith, who recalled, 

Goldsmith wrote several themes for the score including the lullaby "Carol Anne's Theme" to represent blissful suburban life and the young female protagonist, an elegant semi-religious melody for dealings of the souls caught between worlds, and several dissonant, atonal blasts during moments of terror.Poltergeist soundtrack review at AllMusic, accessed February 16, 2011. The score went on to garner Goldsmith an Oscar nomination for Best Original Score, though he lost to fellow composer John Williams for E.T. the Extra-Terrestrial.

Goldsmith's score was first released in 1982 on LP through MGM Records in a 38-minute version. Rhino Movie Music later released a 68-minute cut on CD in 1997. A two-disc soundtrack album later followed on December 9, 2010 by Film Score Monthly featuring additional source and alternate material. The 2010 release also included previously unreleased tracks from Goldsmith's score to The Prize (1963).

There is an alternate version of "Carol Anne's theme" which has lyrics. That version is unofficially titled "Bless this House" (which is a line from the chorus). It was not featured in the film, but was part of the original album.

 Release 

 MPAA rating Poltergeist initially received an R rating from the MPAA. Steven Spielberg and Tobe Hooper disagreed with the R rating and succeeded in having it changed to PG on appeal.

 Reissues 
The film was reissued on October 29, 1982 to take advantage of the Halloween weekend. It was shown in theaters for one night only on October 4, 2007 to promote the new restored and remastered 25th-anniversary DVD, released five days later. This event also included the documentary "They Are Here: The Real World of Poltergeists", which was created for the new DVD.

The Poltergeist franchise is believed by some to be cursed due to the premature deaths of several people associated with the film (including that of Heather O'Rourke), a notion that was the focus of an E! True Hollywood Story.

 Home media Poltergeist was released on VHS, Betamax, CED, and LaserDisc in 1982. On April 8, 1997, MGM Home Entertainment released Poltergeist on DVD in a snap case, and the only special feature was a trailer. In 1998, Poltergeist was re-released on DVD with the same cover and disc as the 1997 release, but in a keep case and with an eight-page booklet. In 1999, a snap case edition with the same DVD disc, but a different cover was released by Warner Home Video after the pre-1986 MGM library was acquired by the Time Warner-owned Turner Entertainment. Warner Home Video tentatively scheduled releases for the 25th-anniversary edition of the film on standard DVD, HD DVD, and Blu-ray in Spain and the US on October 9, 2007. The re-release was billed as having digitally remastered picture and sound, and a two-part documentary: "They Are Here: The Real World of Poltergeists", which makes extensive use of clips from the film. The remastered DVD of the film was released as scheduled, but both high-definition releases were eventually canceled. Warner rescheduled the high-definition version of the film and eventually released it only on the Blu-ray format on October 14, 2008.Poltergeist was released by Warner Bros. Home Entertainment on 4K UHD Blu-ray on September 20, 2022.

 Novelization 
A novelization was written by James Kahn, adapted from the film's original screenplay. It was printed in the United States through Warner Books, with the first printing in May 1982. While the film focuses mainly on the Freeling family, much of the book leans toward the relationship between Tangina and Dr. Lesh away from the family. The novel also expands upon many scenes from the film, such as the nighttime manifestation of outer-dimensional entities of fire and shadows in the Freelings' living room, and an extended version of the kitchen scene in which Marty watches a steak crawl across a countertop. In the book, Marty is frozen in place and skeletonized by spiders and rats. There are also additional elements not in the film, such as Robbie's mysterious discovery of the clown doll in the yard during his birthday party, and a benevolent spirit, "The Waiting Woman", who protects Carol Anne in the spirit world.

 Reception 
 Box office Poltergeist was released theatrically by Metro-Goldwyn-Mayer on June 4, 1982. The film was a commercial success and earned $76,606,280 in the United States, making it the highest-grossing horror film of 1982 and eighth overall for the year.

 Critical response 
The film was well received by critics and is considered by many as a classic of the horror genre as well as one of the best films of 1982. On review aggregator Rotten Tomatoes it has an approval rating of 88% based on reviews from 72 critics, with an average rating of 7.40/10. The site's consensus reads: "Smartly filmed, tightly scripted, and—most importantly—consistently frightening, Poltergeist is a modern horror classic." On Metacritic it has a score of 79% based on reviews from 16 critics, indicating "generally favorable reviews". Roger Ebert gave Poltergeist three stars out of four and called it "an effective thriller, not so much because of the special effects, as because Hooper and Spielberg have tried to see the movie's strange events through the eyes of the family members, instead of just standing back and letting the special effects overwhelm the cast along with the audience." Vincent Canby of The New York Times called it "a marvelously spooky ghost story" with "extraordinary technical effects" that were "often eerie and beautiful but also occasionally vividly gruesome." Andrew Sarris, in The Village Voice, wrote that when Carol Anne is lost, the parents and the two older children "come together in blood-kin empathy to form a larger-than-life family that will reach down to the gates of hell to save its loved ones." In the Los Angeles Herald Examiner, Peter Rainer wrote:

Buried within the plot of Poltergeist is a basic, splendid fairy tale scheme: the story of a little girl who puts her parents through the most outrageous tribulation to prove their love for her. Underlying most fairy tales is a common theme: the comforts of family. Virtually all fairy tales begin with a disrupting of the family order, and their conclusion is usually a return to order.

Not all reviews were as positive. Gene Siskel gave the film one-and-a-half stars out of four, writing that Poltergeist "is very good at getting the details of suburban life right—in other words, it sets its stage beautifully—but when it comes time for the terror to begin, the whole thing is very, very silly." Gary Arnold of The Washington Post observed that the film "looks and feels decidedly patchy, as if it had been assembled by different hands frequently working at cross purposes." Sheila Benson of the Los Angeles Times wrote, "In terms of simple, flat-out, roof-rattling fright, 'Poltergeist' gives full value. In terms of story, however, simple is indeed the word, and dumb might be a better one. And when so many effects are lavished on a story this frail, you have a lopsided film."

 Accolades 
The film has continued to receive recognition 40 years after its release. Poltergeist was selected by The New York Times as one of The Best 1000 Movies Ever Made. It also received recognition from the American Film Institute, with a number 84 ranking on AFI's 100 Years...100 Thrills list; "They're here" was named the 69th-greatest movie quote on AFI's 100 Years...100 Movie Quotes.

The film received three Oscar nominations: Best Original Score, Best Sound Effects Editing, and Best Visual Effects, losing them all to Spielberg's E.T. the Extra-Terrestrial.

 Legacy 

 Sequels and remakes 
In 1986, Poltergeist II: The Other Side retained the family but introduced a new motive for the Beast's behavior, tying him to an evil cult leader named Henry Kane, who led his religious sect to their doom in the 1820s. As the Beast, Kane went to extraordinary lengths to keep his "flock" under his control, even in death. The original motive of the cemetery's souls disturbed by the housing development was thereby altered; the cemetery was now explained to be built above a cave where Kane and his flock met their ends.  It also reveals that the women of the family are actually psychics.Poltergeist III, released in 1988, finds Carol Anne as the sole original family member living in an elaborate Chicago skyscraper owned and inhabited by her aunt, uncle and cousin. Kane follows her there and uses the building's ubiquitous decorative mirrors as a portal to the Earthly plane.

The 1988 Italian film Ghosthouse (also known as La casa 3), written and directed by Umberto Lenzi, has been described as an imitation of the original Poltergeist.

In 2013, a remake of the original Poltergeist, produced by MGM and 20th Century Fox and directed by Gil Kenan, was announced. Sam Raimi, Rob Tapert, and Roy Lee produced the film, which stars Sam Rockwell, Jared Harris, and Rosemarie DeWitt. Poltergeist was released on May 22, 2015.

On April 10, 2019, it was announced that the Russo Brothers would helm a new remake.

 In popular culture 
The song "Shining" by horror punk band Misfits, on their 1997 album American Psycho, is based directly on the film, with the chorus centered on the refrain: "Carol Anne, Carol Anne".

Spice Girls pays homage to the film in their 1997 music video for the song "Too Much".

Two separate animated TV series helmed by Seth MacFarlane have parodied Poltergeist. In the 2006 Family Guy episode "Petergeist", Peter Griffin discovers an Indian burial ground when he attempts to build a multiplex in a backyard. When he takes an Indian chief's skull, a poltergeist invades the Griffins' home. The episode used some of the same musical cues heard in the film and recreates several of its scenes. American Dad! also parodied the film with the season 10 episode "Poltergasm", in which the Smith house has become haunted by Francine's unsatisfied sex drive.

The 2001 comedy horror film Scary Movie 2 parodies the movie's clown doll attack in Robbie's bedroom, as well as Diane's levitation.Poltergeist'' was the subject of walk through attractions at both Universal Studios Orlando and Hollywood's annual Halloween Horror Nights event.

See also 

 "Little Girl Lost" (The Twilight Zone)
 List of ghost films

References

External links 
 
 
 
 
 

Poltergeist (franchise)
1982 horror films
1982 films
1982 thriller films
American ghost films
American haunted house films
American supernatural horror films
American supernatural thriller films
American thriller films
Amblin Entertainment films
BAFTA winners (films)
Films scored by Jerry Goldsmith
Films about television
Films directed by Tobe Hooper
Films produced by Frank Marshall
Films produced by Steven Spielberg
Films set in Orange County, California
Films shot in California
Metro-Goldwyn-Mayer films
United Artists films
Films with screenplays by Steven Spielberg
Films with screenplays by Michael Grais
Films with screenplays by Mark Victor
1980s supernatural films
1980s English-language films
1980s American films